Hydrometra stagnorum, the common water-measurer, is a species of aquatic bugs in the family Hydrometridae, the water measurers.

Distribution
This species is found in numerous European countries, including Hungary and Austria. In Great Britain it is quite common in Leicestershire and Rutland.

Description 
Hydrometra stagnorum is normally wingless, but sometimes has full wings. It is often dark greyish or even black in colour, and grows to approximately 13mm. The head and body are long and thin. Its antennae appear similar to a fourth pair of legs.

Habitat 
This species lives at the vegetated margins in slow moving streams, as well as ditches and ponds. It lives close to the emergent stems of plants, upon which it lays its eggs.

Behaviour
As adults, rows slowly over the surface of the water in search of prey. It seeks mosquito larvae and water fleas directly below the surface film. It catches these by spearing them through the surface of the water.

This species can jump if disturbed.

References

External links
 Distribution map in England
 Image

Hydrometroidea
Articles containing video clips
Hemiptera of Europe
Taxa named by Carl Linnaeus
Bugs described in 1758